Yoo Seon-ho (born January 28, 2002) is a South Korean singer, actor and model. He is best known as a contestant on the survival reality show Produce 101 (season 2) and drama Under the Queen's Umbrella. He is a cast member of the variety show 2 Days & 1 Night since 2022.

Early life and education 
Yoo Seon-ho was born on January 28, 2002, in Seoul, South Korea. He was alumni of Hanlim Multi Art School.

Career

2017: Acting debut
Soon after Produce 101 ended, Yoo became a regular guest on a new variety show called Special Private Life together with other fellow Produce 101 contestants. He also had guest appearances in variety shows like Live Talk Show Taxi and Problematic Men. In August 2017, Yoo started appearing as a regular guest for a few episode on Channel A's Let's Eat Out This Saturday. From July to August 2017, Yoo along with BtoB's Yook Sung-jae promoted for TMON's Let's Fly TMON Tour campaign.

On August 3 it was revealed that Yoo would make his acting debut in the web-drama Mischievous Detectives alongside Apink's Namjoo and fellow Produce 101 Contestant Ahn Hyung Seob. Yoo played the role of Pyo Han Eum, an honorary forensic investigator that was awarded for solving a murder case. The web-drama surpassed 10 million views in a month on Naver.
Yoo acted as the main protagonist of 10cm's music video for the song Pet, having been chosen by the singer himself.

In October 2017, Yoo was part of the main cast of the beauty variety show The Cushion together with BtoB's Jung Il-hoon and popular Korean beauty YouTuber Lena.

Yoo held his first fanmeet The Most Preferred Time on October 27 at the Woori Art Hall in Seoul's Olympic Park. The fanmeet sold out in less than five minutes which saw Cube Entertainment adding a second date, on October 28.

On October 20, was revealed that Yoo will guest on One Night Food Trip alongside his label mate, Pentagon's Hui, the filming started in Vietnam on October 22. Seonho was confirmed as part of variety show cast tvN's Nest Escape 2, with filming taking place in Greece.

2018–present: Solo debut and activities
Yoo joined the cast of variety show Photo People 2 with filming taking place in Japan in March 2018.

After finishes his fan meeting tour with Osaka, Hong Kong, Taiwan, Bangkok and Tokyo on December 23, 2017, he will held an encore fanmeeting at Olympic Hall, Olympic Park in Seoul on April 14 with 2500 seats and were sold out in 1 minute.

Yoo made his solo debut with EP Spring, Seonho on April 11, 2018, with the lead single "Maybe Spring" composed by Lee Jin-ah.

In July 2018 it was revealed that he will return to play Pyo Han Eum in Mischievous Detective Season 2. Seonho was also cast in variety show JTBC's Carefree Travellers as fixed cast. Yoo became the model for Goobne a chicken brand. A CF like a youth movie was release starring Yoo Seonho, which surpassed 3.4 million views.

In 2019, Yoo, alongside Lai Kuan-lin and Ha Neul were chosen as new models for TBJ clothing brand. On June 10, Yoo became the ambassador for Korea Pediatric Diabetes Association alongside (G)I-dle.

In December 2019, Seon-ho become a regular guest in SBS's basketball variety show Handsome Tigers. The show premiered in January 2020. Later in December, Seonho was cast in tvN's new variety show Cat's Meow Is Fake, the show was aired on January 5, 2020.

In 2021, Yoo joined JTBC drama Undercover, playing the son of Ji Jin-hee and Kim Hyun-joo, who has autism.

In 2022, Yoo returned to the small screen with the MBC drama Doctor Lawyer, playing the teenage So Ji-sub. Later he joined the tvN historical drama Under the Queen's Umbrella, which was broadcast in October 2022. The same year, Yoo became a fixed cast member of the KBS2 reality show 2 Days & 1 Night Season 4, with his first episode airing in December.

Endorsements
In between 2017 and 2019, Yoo Seon-ho has endorsed TMON Tour Nalja Titu, Goodal, GS25, Acuvue, TMRW, Goobne  and TBJ.

Ambassadorship 
In 2019 Yoo was Public Relations Ambassador of Korea Pediatric Diabetes Association with boyband Pentagon.

Discography

Extended plays

Singles

Soundtrack appearances

Collaborations

Filmography

Film

Television series

Web series

Reality shows

Television  shows

Web show

Hosting

Awards and nominations

Notes

References

External links 

 
 Yu Seon-ho at HanCinema

2002 births
Living people
K-pop singers
South Korean child singers
South Korean dance musicians
South Korean male television actors
South Korean male idols
South Korean male web series actors
Produce 101 contestants
Cube Entertainment artists
21st-century South Korean  male singers
Hanlim Multi Art School alumni